Polyalthia angustissima is a species of plant in the Annonaceae family. It is a tree found in Malaysia, Singapore, and possibly Vietnam.

References

angustissima
Trees of Malaya
Data deficient plants
Taxonomy articles created by Polbot